Diasemia grammalis is a moth of the family Crambidae. It is endemic to New Zealand. Adults are orchard or packhouse contaminants. It was first described by Edward Doubleday in the book Travels in New Zealand. The larvae feed on native grasses and herbaceous plants.

References

External links

 Citizen science observations of Diasemia grammalis

Spilomelinae
Moths of New Zealand
Moths described in 1843
Taxa named by Edward Doubleday